One of the many unaided colleges of Pharmacy in Maharashtra, Rajghad Dnyeenpeeth's College of Pharmacy is located in the town of Bhor in Pune district. It is managed by Rajghad Dnyeenpeeth foundation which was established by Anantrao Thopte.

History
R. D. College of Pharmacy was established in 1992 starting with a 2-year diploma course in Pharmacy. A 4-year degree course was started in 1994. The first principal of the college currently is Dr. Rajkumar. V. Shete (Rtd. Dean University of Pune, faculty of Pharmacology). The degree college was affiliated to University of Pune in the beginning and then to Maharashtra University of Health Sciences. The first four batches of degree seeking students from this college received their pharmacy degrees from University of Pune.

Location
Bhor is located 60 kilometers away from Pune. MSRTC buses run from Bhor to Swargate bus stand in Pune city every 20 minutes. It takes about 90 minutes from Bhor to Pune by bus. Situated in a picturesque location amid hills of Sahyadri range, Bhor is an ideal setting for a Pharmacy School. Even though Bhor has its rural touches, it is a really nice place to live for 4 years and do a bachelor's degree.

Academics
Rajghad Dnyeenpeeth's College of Pharmacy is accredited by All India Council for Technical Education (AICTE) and Pharmacy Council of India, a statutory body governed by the provisions of the Pharmacy Act, 1948 passed by the Indian Parliament. The faculty at Rajghad Dnyeenpeeth's College of Pharmacy includes professors like S. Budhavale who has been with the school since its inception. The intake every year in this Pharmacy School is of 40 students for the degree course. Many students of this college have gone to make a career in the field of Pharmaceutical Sales and Marketing. Some of the students have migrated abroad to United States where they are working as pharmacists and research scientists in academia as well as in the pharmaceutical industry.

References

External links

Education in Pune district
Pharmacy colleges in Maharashtra
Educational institutions established in 1992
1992 establishments in Maharashtra